Prigorki is a rural locality (a khutor) in Prokhorovsky District, Belgorod Oblast, Russia. The population was 142 as of 2010. There are 3 streets.

Geography 
Prigorki is located 19 km north of Prokhorovka (the district's administrative centre) by road. Verkhnyaya Olshanka is the nearest rural locality.

References 

Rural localities in Prokhorovsky District